The Southeast Missouri State Redhawks are the athletic teams of Southeast Missouri State University (SEMO), located in Cape Girardeau, Missouri, United States. The Redhawks athletic program is a member of the Ohio Valley Conference (OVC) and competes at the NCAA Division I level including the Football Championship Subdivision. The SEMO mascot is Rowdy the Redhawk and the school colors are red and black.

Sports sponsored

Southeast Missouri State was a charter member of  the Division II athletic conference Mid-America Intercollegiate Athletics Association (MIAA) from 1912 until moving to Division I  and joining the OVC in 1991. Before January 2005, the athletic team nicknames were the "Indians" (men's teams) and "Otahkians" (women's teams), and the University's mascot was known as Chief Sagamore, represented by a student dressed in Native American regalia.  Chief Sagamore was retired as mascot in the mid-1980s due to a growing cultural sensitivity to Native American mascots, but the team names lasted for nearly 20 more years. After a movement by Student Government, the Booster Club and the National Alumni Council, those names were officially retired in a ceremony on October 22, 2004, and replaced with "Redhawks."

A member of the Ohio Valley Conference, Southeast Missouri State University sponsors six men's and nine women's teams in NCAA sanctioned sports:

National championships
The Redhawks have won one team NCAA national championship, at the Division II level.

Team

Individual teams

Basketball

The men's basketball team won a share of the regular season OVC title in 2000, and won the conference's tournament as well that year to earn an automatic bid to the 2000 NCAA Tournament.  In the team's first appearance in "The Big Dance", the Redhawks were seeded #13 in the West Region and set to face off against Louisiana State University in the opening round of the tournament.  In an exciting game, 4th-seeded LSU Tigers narrowly escaped the upset as they held off the Indians 64–61. The current head coach, as of the 2020-21 season, is Brad Korn.

On March 4, 2023, the RedHawks held off Tennessee Tech 89-82 in OT where they won the OVC’s automatic bid to “The Big Dance”, going there for just the  second time in program history.

Football 

The football team has also had its struggles since moving up to Division I-AA (now Division I FCS) in 1991, having only 4 winning seasons (1994, 2000, 2010, 2018).  The football program finally had some redemption during the 2002 season as the team made it into the I-AA polls for the first time, finishing the season ranked #23 in the ESPN/USA Today I-AA poll and #24 in the Sports Network I-AA poll.  That season also produced the school's only win over a I-A opponent since moving to I-AA, as the Redhawks topped Middle Tennessee 24–14 in Murfreesboro, Tennessee. They would go on to win their Ohio Valley Conference title in 2010, making their first playoff appearance the same year.

References

External links